The Journal of Chemometrics is a monthly peer-reviewed scientific journal published since 1987 by John Wiley & Sons. It publishes original scientific papers, reviews, and short communications on fundamental and applied aspects of chemometrics. The current editor-in-chief is Age K. Smilde (University of Amsterdam).

Abstracting and indexing 
Journal of Chemometrics is abstracted and indexed in:
 Chemical Abstracts Service
 Scopus
 Web of Science
According to the Journal Citation Reports, the journal has a 2020 impact factor of 2.467, ranking it 27th out of 64 journals in the category "Instruments & Instrumentation", 35th out of 63 journals in the category "Automation & Control Systems", 30th out of 125 journals in the category "Statistics & Probability", 40th out of 108 journals in the category "Mathematics Interdisciplinary Applications", and 54th out of 87 journals in the category "Chemistry Analytical",

Highest cited papers 

 Selectivity, local rank, three-way data analysis and ambiguity in multivariate curve resolution, Volume 9, Issue 1, Jan-Feb 1995, Pages: 31–58, Tauler R, Smilde A, Kowalski B. Cited 370 times.
 Genetic algorithms as a strategy for feature-selection, Volume 6, Issue 5, Sep-Oct 1992, Pages: 267–281, Leardi R, Boggia R, Terrile M. Cited 296 times.
 Multiway calibration. Multilinear PLS, Volume 10, Issue 1, Jan-Feb 1996, Pages: 47–61, Bro R. Cited 290 times.

References

External links 
 

Chemistry journals
Statistics journals
Wiley (publisher) academic journals
Publications established in 1987
English-language journals
Monthly journals